Thanakrit "Wan" Panichwid (commonly referred to by nickname and first name as Wan Thanakrit) is a Thai singer and actor. Born on 12 August 1985 in Nonthaburi, Thailand, he is best known as one of the 12 contestants of Academy Fantasia Season 2 and sung the official soundtrack of the Asian sleeper hit movie First Love (A Little Thing Called Love). Wan is currently a DJ at two radio stations. He's a DJ as 89Banana on Monday through Friday from 4-6PM, and at 94EFM on Saturday and Sunday at 2-5PM with Phanupol Ekpetch (Jo AF2). Aside from being a singer, actor, and a DJ, he's also a songwriter.  He graduate bachelor's degree from Jankasem Rajabhat University (Faculty of Humanities and Social Science) he attending University of Bangkok for master's degree

Discography

Studio albums
Baby Hip-Pro (only sang one song, titled "Waak!!")
Patibatkarn Ray Kai Fun (with AF2)
Dream Team (with AF1 and AF2)
Plam Plam (with Jo AF2 and My AF2)
Soul Much in Love (with AF1, AF2, and AF3)
AF The Musical "Ngern Ngern Ngern" Soundtrack
Wan Soloist (Wan's first solo album/2007)
AF The Musical "Jojo-san" Soundtrack
Asoke (3rd Album/2011)

Filmography

Dramas
Peun Ruk Nak Lah Fun with AF2 (Ch.7)
Tang Fah Tawan Diew with Rotmay Kaneungnij Jaksamittanon (Ch.3 2006)
Kom Ruk Kom Sanae Ha with Rotmay Kaneungnij Jaksamittanon (Ch.ITV 2006)
Pok Pah Peur Mae (Ch.9 2007)
Fai Deurn Hah Gub Fon Deurn Hok (Ch.9 2007)
Ruk Nee Kiang Tawan (Ch.7 2009)
Tat Dao Bussaya (2009) with Rotmay Kaneungnij Jaksamittanon (Ch.3 2010)
Ruk Lon Lon 9 Kon 4 Ku (Modern 9 TV 2010)
Pla Lhai Paai Daeng with Jaja Primrata Dejudom (Ch.3 2011)
Mia Taeng (Ch.3 2011)
Under Her Nose (Workpoint 2017)

Movies
Yern Pay Lay Say Ma Gu Teh (2007) as Sahat
Before Valentine Gon Ruk...Moon Rob Tua Rao (2009) as Suthee
Sweety Movie (2011)

Commercials
Honda Click
Phillip Light Bulb
7–11

References

External links

1985 births
Living people
Thanakrit Panichwid
Thanakrit Panichwid